The conservation and restoration of musical instruments is performed by conservator-restorers who are professionals, properly trained to preserve or protect historical and current musical instruments from past or future damage or deterioration. Because musical instruments can be made entirely of, or simply contain, a wide variety of materials such as plastics, woods, metals, silks, and skin, to name a few, a conservator should be well-trained in how to properly examine the many types of construction materials used in order to provide the highest level or preventive and restorative conservation.

The conservation and restoration of musical instruments presents an issue that is unlike any faced elsewhere in the art world. Unlike paintings, sculptures and photographs, musical instruments are functional objects that cannot be fully appreciated through their visual aspects alone - much of their artistic value comes from the sound that they are able to produce. It is because of this that before beginning any treatments, determination should be made as to whether the piece will be available for display only or if there is intention to be able to perform with the instrument, as making an instrument available for performance may require the replacement of original pieces such as strings and drumheads, thus raising ethical issues relating to how much of the original object should be replaced and to what end.

Background
Musical instrument conservation, at least by the date of the earliest reference acquired, originates from 1862 when “a letter was written by Antonio Stradivari, who not only 
repaired his own instruments but also those of other makers, for Count Cesare Castelbarco about how
to conserve his many Stradivari instruments.”

There are many similarities between musical instrument conservation and art work protection. Like a conservator working to restore the color saturation of the water lilies in a Claude Monet painting, conservators should keep in mind the instrument maker's integrity when cleaning or restoring any type of musical instrument (for example, luthiers create guitars and violins for guitarists or violinists), as well as the standardized policies or ethics of art conservation. According to the Code of Ethics, “II. All actions of the conservation professional must be governed by an informed respect for the cultural property, its unique character and significance, and the people or person who created it.” Both art conservation and musical instrument conservation require a lot of attention to detail, patience, and respect for the item or artist(s). The conservator should also be highly trained in the medium in which these items were created. For example, wood preservation or acrylic on canvas.

In general, art works are static and not moving whereas musical instruments are basically an active art tool for producing the sounds notated on sheet music in various keys or tempos. Although some art objects may have more than one use and move periodically from its home institution to another museum on loan (besides providing cultural satisfaction), instruments are subject to: travel or wear and tear consistently due to continual playing. Musical instruments create art by producing sound because the human hand touches their skins, strings, bows, fret board or keys. Musical instruments are generally used on a regular basis, during recitals and concerts by all levels of musicians.

An instrumentalist should keep in mind how to play their instrument carefully so that they can preserve the integrity of the instrument. That being stated, each musician performs with an instrument differently, creating their own personality and take on the capabilities of that particular instrument (ex. Louis Armstrong and his trumpet). In a sense, the partnership between instrumentalist and instrument defines them both. “Players demand certain kinds of physical responses from an instrument, and players and listeners alike have certain preferences about the tone produced.”

Despite how long musical instruments should last, it is important to try to maintain their playable conditions as long as possible. Similarly to automobiles that have been used on a daily basis over the years, musical instruments do not sound the same or work in the same manner that they once did when they were new. Parts wear out and at times just need to be replaced. On a side note, the average lifespan of instruments depends on the classification of them: “woodwinds or brass instruments last about twenty years, while pianos last about 100 years, and string instruments for a maximum of 200 years." With proper conservation techniques used on instruments, they will be able to last longer than their projected lifespans.

Some music composed during the 18th century by Wolfgang Amadeus Mozart was for the harpsichord, and if this music is to be historically understood it must be heard on an instrument of the original time period. The Smithsonian has maintained a harpsichord that some of the resident curators can periodically play. This can be seen via the short YouTube video entitled, “Play it Again.” Although these Mozart compositions could be played on a piano, they would not sound the same as a harpsichord when a musician performs the piece.

Environmental obligations exist for both musical instrument creators and conservators. This is because the materials used in instrument creation, like wood, can be on the endangered species list. “Many species of rosewood and ebony are endangered, but the wood is still easily purchased.’ ‘Some timbers and materials used by luthiers has legal restrictions, especially when crossing international boundaries.” There appears to be a mission to conserve both art or cultural artifacts and environmental conservation in the realm of musical instrument conservation.

Classification systems 

In 1914, the Curt Sachs and Erich Moritz von Hornbostel's system for the Classification of Musical Instruments was created. It is divided into five main sections with several subcategories. Understanding how an instrument is intended to be used and which of these categories it falls into is vital information if a conservator is to determine how a piece will need to be repaired in order for it to be safely playable. Additionally, understanding the construction of an instrument and where it is experiencing tension will help to determine the safest methods of storage.

The five main sections are defined as:

Idiophones - Idiophones are instruments that rely on the body of the instrument to create and resonate sound. Most commonly constructed of metal, a conservator will need to examine the metal for cracks and tarnish that will negatively impact the sound and structural integrity of the instrument.

 Concussion - Instruments that create sound when struck against a similar object such as castanets
 Friction - Instruments that create sound when rubbed such as a glass harp
 Percussion - Instruments that create sound when struck such as a triangle
 Plucked - Instruments that create sound when plucked such as a harp
 Scraped - Instruments that create sound when scraped such as a washboard
 Shaken - Instruments that create sound when shook such as a maraca
 Stamping - Instruments that create sound when stamped against a hard surface such as a tap shoes
 Stamped - The sound that the surface itself makes when something is stamped against it

Membranophones - Membranophones are instruments that have a membrane that is stretched over a structure, often wood or metal, and struck or rubbed to produce a sound. The subcategories are largely determined by the shape of the structure that the membrane is stretched over. For many historic membranophones to become playable again, a conservator may have ti weigh replacing the membrane of the piece. 
 
 Kettle drums
 Tubular drums 
 Friction drums
 Mirlitons - This subsection is unique to the membranophones category as it relies on air passing over the membrane, rather than it being struck. The most common example of a mirliton is a Kazoo
 Frame drums/Pot drums/Ground drums

Chordophones - Chordophones are instruments that use vibrating strings, which are most commonly stretched across a metal or wooden structure, to create sound. Similar to the membranes used on membranophones, the strings that are used on chordophones may need to be replaced if an instrument is to be performed with. A conservator will need to examine the structure of the instrument to see if stress cracks from the tension of the strings have begun to develop.

 Musical Bows
 Harps
 Lyres
 Lutes
 Zithers

Aerophones - Aerophones are instruments that require air passing through, or across, them to create sound. Most commonly constructed of wood or metal, a conservator will need to examine the innards for mold or debris that will prohibit air from passing easily through the instrument.

 Brasswinds - The most commonly known is the trumpet
 Woodwinds - The most commonly known is the flute
 Free-Reed - The most commonly known is the accordion
 Free - Free instruments are unique to the aerophone category due their reliance on air passing around the instrument, rather than through it. The most common example is a whip when it is cracked.

Electrophones - Instruments that require electricity to be amplified and heard

Preventive conservation 

Richard Newman of the Museum of Fine Arts Boston calls preventive conservation the "ultimate goal" of conservation-restoration. Conservators should consider the common agents of deterioration when planning the preventive conservation measures of musical instruments.

Physical forces 
Musical instruments are very fragile and should be handled carefully to avoid shock. Musical instruments in museums and other galleries should be safely encased. For musical instruments that “belong to a study or teaching collection, or… simply be in a drawer that experiences a great deal of in-and-out movement during examination of other specimens,” they are more at risk of being damaged because more people are interacting with them. Human interaction should be limited. 
Recommendations include:
 “Avoid placing high tension on stringed (including keyboard) instruments.”
 “Avoid sudden increases or decreases in string tension.”
 “Move pianos only on dollies and when you have enough people to do the job comfortably.”

Fire 
Fire is one of the biggest natural threats to musical instrument collections. Instruments should be housed in facilities with functioning fire detectors and sprinkler systems. Wooden instruments are particularly vulnerable to fire. Museums or other institutions that have musical instruments in their collections should work with local fire stations to plan salvage procedures.

Pests 

Many instruments are made of wood, therefore wood eating insects could damage them if left in a dark, damp, and drafty space. A careful way to get rid of the infestation is through “asphyxiation by carbon dioxide or nitrogen [because they] are the preferred methods, although some work still has to be done on the effects of changes in moisture content of artifacts during treatment.” Additionally, a conservator may choose to place an instrument in a freezer for a period of time as another method of pest eradication. Basic cleanliness of storage areas prevents larger infestations such as rats or roaches.

Light 
Direct sunlight is harmful to musical instruments. Light makes colors fade and also causes the rapid break down of organic materials, such as wood and membranes that are commonly used in many instruments. It is generally best not to place any artifact in a collection in direct light, whether it is natural or artificial. UV filters over windows are efficient in protecting instruments housed near natural light. Artificial light should be limited to 8 foot-candles. “Light damage is a commonly identified problem in collections, and is the subject of vast literature.”

Incorrect relative humidity 
Since musical instruments are compiled of many organic materials such as: wood, metal, or plastic; it makes it difficult to preserve them if they are constantly on display in a museum. “Paper, leather, wood, natural fibers, and other organic materials absorb moisture; if they are kept in non-climate-controlled environments, serious conservation problems arise"  These dilemmas could include corrosion or buckling. Therefore, musical instruments should be kept in RH controlled display cases and storage areas. Areas of vulnerability include joints and adhesives. Instruments that rely on the flow of air and breath are also at risk, as “…fluctuations or sudden changes in temperature or humidity may cause irreversible structural damage, especially in a woodwind, (because of warm, wet breath) or in a stringed instrument or drum, where the vibrating element is under tension”.
Recommendations include:
 “Keep instruments in rooms with relative humidity at about 50%.”

Thieves and vandals 
Institutions that house musical instrument collections or private collectors should be vigilant of the threat of thieves and vandals. Proper security systems should be in place, and security personnel hired to monitor any instruments housed in public places. This is particularly important if the musical instruments are still in playable condition and are played by members of the public.

Water 
Water is another common natural threat to musical instruments. Flood and rain waters can compromise instruments, especially wooden instruments that can become warped and retain humidity after getting wet because they are moisture dependent. Instruments made of metal or other alloy materials can also be damaged by water. The reaction of water and metal is one of the biggest issues faced by musical instrument conservators.
Recommendations include:
 “Clear the moisture from wind instruments immediately after they are played.”

Pollutants 
Pollutants are an unavoidable environmental threat, especially for musical instruments housed in urban areas. Conservators should be well versed in the pollutants in their area and how they will affect musical instrument conservation. HVAC systems should be up to date and filtering clean air. Conservators should always wear gloves to prevent oil from transferring from hands to the surface of polish or painted instruments.
Recommendations include:
 Preserve the natural patina on brass instruments; don't handle them with bare hands or polish them.” 
 “Do not oil or polish the surfaces of a wooden instrument.”

Incorrect temperature 
Instruments, whether played or not, should be kept at 68 degrees F.
If a space is too warm, wooden instruments may retain moisture from the air and warp, which can eventually lead to cracks in the structure. Even small fissures in the wood can greatly impact the sound that the instrument is able to produce. 
Recommendations include:
 “If you play wooden-bore wind instruments, warm them up and play them in gradually.”

Dissociation 
Preventive conservation measures should be periodically reviewed by conservators to ensure up to date methods are being practiced.

Conservation practices
Musical instruments are often very fragile and complex objects that should be conserved both externally and internally. When deciding the course of a conservation treatment, conservators should be experts in the history of the instrument and its material. Conservators should aim to restore the instrument to its original physical form or acoustic playability in the least destructive way possible using "non destructive analytical tools". Techniques such as spot treatments should be used to test the instruments reaction to particular conservation treatments in controlled areas, and technology such as CT scans and X-radiography should be used by conservators to analyze the internal mechanisms of musical instruments without invasive measures.

Conservators of musical instruments can also borrow conservation science methods from other objects to which instruments are similar. Instruments often “have moving parts or they require physical interaction to fulfill the purpose for which they were made. They have this in common with many other objects including clocks, transport vehicles, arms and armor, hand tools, domestic utensils, scientific apparatus and industrial machinery”.

String instruments, rely on the plucking of strings to create sound. Conservators should be versed in not only the construction of the instrument itself, but also the tension levels required to maintain the ideal acoustic sound of a particular instrument. Woodwind instruments are most often constructed of wood or metal but other materials such as plastic or brass may be used as well. Since air is blown into woodwind instruments to create sound, humidity can be trapped inside instruments. This is a particular concern for wooden woodwinds. Brass instruments are made exclusively of brass. Corrosion should be the highest concern for conservators working with brass instruments. Percussion instruments are particularly vulnerable as they are instruments designed to be struck or hit in order to create sound.

Ethics and playability 
Determining the playability of musical instruments can be difficult, especially in terms of the ethics of conservation-restoration. Ethical codes state that the aesthetic, historic and physical integrity of an object must to be respected. Often returning an instrument to playable condition requires modifications that cannot be readily undone, and removing unserviceable parts may also mean removing important historical evidence, such as original tool marks. Ethically, it is important to note that any techniques where the results cannot be undone should not be used in the conservation-restoration of instruments. 
Playability depends on the overall strength of the architecture of the instrument as well as the musician's interpretation or technique of a musical score. There are always two sides to every story: those for restoring musical instruments and those that are against. One of the arguments supporting the playing of instruments is that as a condition of their inclusion in public collections they are to be played. Other times, historical instruments are tied to educational institutions and certain period music cannot be fully appreciated without the use of historical instruments. On the other hand, while restoration work is done with the right intentions restoring an instrument to playable condition has proven to be detrimental to the long term preservation of instruments and is inconsistent with standards of practices for other classes of museum objects. 
“The opponents of restoration argue that the truly authentic instrument is a reproduction of that relic, to the best of present knowledge and ability, in a state equivalent to what it was when new.’ ‘A great deal of progress could result from making a distinction between “soundability” and playability, where the former can often be achieved without any prerequisite restoration.” Therefore, who in the cultural artifact conservation world draws the line between “soundability ” and playability? 
Musical instruments are designed to be played, they have moving parts that are intended to be used. The integrity of an instrument includes its sound, however, playing an instrument is inherently destructive and many times attempts to return instruments to playable condition mean modifying the original in ways that are not easily undone.
The restoration of musical instruments is highly debated, this is due in part to the fact that notion of playability has not been defined enough. It is agreed upon that historic instruments are vital to understanding the history of music, but it is possible that reproductions may produce a more authentic sound, and a sound closer to that of the original instrument in its prime, than a restored original would sound. By playing reproductions it also eliminates the debate between ethics and playability, since the reproduction is not the original instrument.

Factors for functional restoration 

According to Robert Barclay, the following are a list of the top five reasons for functional restoration. First, a restoration can be completed if “the instrument is mass-produced.” Second, if “the instrument has been previously restored and most ephemeral has been lost.” Third, with a little bit of work from a conservator, “the instrument can easily be put into working condition.” Fourth, “the original function can be reestablished.” Lastly, if “the instrument is in sturdy condition,” then it could be conserved. Its also vital to consider functional restoration if a reproduction instrument would not produce results equivalent to what a restored instrument would produce. This is very important to consider, especially if a historical instrument is tied to an educational institution.

Factors against functional restoration 
Barclay also mentions some explanations for not functionally restoring musical instruments and the top five reasons are as follows. First a musical instrument should not be conserved if “the instrument is unique.” Second, work should not be completed if “the original ephemeral features will be lost or altered.” Third, the way the instrument could be played is unknown or “the function is obscure and unlikely to be determined as a result of restoration.” Fourth, “the condition of the instrument is such that an accurate achievement of its original quality of function is unlikely.” Lastly, if “the function is so well understood that no new information is likely to be gained.” It is also important to remember that functional restoration does not always align with the ethics and standards of practice of conservation-restoration. Functional restoration is generally more intrusive than basic conservation techniques, and will generally result in a greater loss of original components of the instrument.

Condition reporting before and after restoration with photographs and other documentation 

Similarly to the document(s) that a museum registrar might use to catalog an artifact into a collection, it is important to keep the proper paperwork during the conservation process being done on a musical instrument. (If interested, there is also an example of a museum condition report right here from the Cleveland Museum of Contemporary Art. Additionally by taking before and after camera shots, it helps to document the steps taken by the conservator (or the rest of the conservation staff) while working on an instrument and the progress made during the duration of the project. A checklist could also help conservators stay focused on the task at hand trying to restore a particular musical instrument. But each plan is different for the conservation process depending on how severely wounded the instrument in question may be.

References

External links
 Musical Instrument Department at the Metropolitan Museum of Art
 Winterthur/University of Delaware Program in Art Conservation- 2nd Year Students of Musical Instrument Conservation 
 Scotland Group Blog
 National Center for Preservation Technology & Training: The Philosophy of In-use Musical Instrument Conservation (Podcast 28)
 Musical Instrument Museum: Conservation Lab
 Smithsonian Museum Conservation Institute: Caring for Musical Instruments
 West Dean College- Making Stringed Musical Instruments
 Times Union Article
 University of Delaware- Musical Instrument Conservation Blog
 The Manual of Musical Instrument Conservation
Occupational Video - Musical Instrument Repair Technician
Play It Again Video

Conservation and restoration of cultural heritage
Musical instruments